The Doris Day Show is an American sitcom created by James Fritzell that aired on CBS from September 24, 1968, to March 12, 1973.

Series overview

Episodes

Season 1 (1968–69)

Season 2 (1969–70)

Season 3 (1970–71)

Season 4 (1971–72)

Season 5 (1972–73)

External links
 

The Doris Day Show Episodes
Doris Day Show